The slate-throated whitestart or slate-throated redstart (Myioborus miniatus) is a species of bird in the family Parulidae native to Central and South America.

Description
It has a deep rufous head, dark back, and contrasting bright yellow breast, belly and white vent and tail tips. The bill is black, and the legs are blackish-gray.

While most of its plumage changes little throughout its large range, the underparts grade from yellow in most of its range, to red in the northernmost part.

Distribution and habitat
It is found disjunctly in humid highland forests, from upper understory to mid canopy, in Mexico, Central America, the Andes from western Venezuela to northwestern Argentina, the Venezuelan Coastal Range, Sierra Nevada de Santa Marta and the tepuis.

Behavior
Pairs remain together throughout year, often accompanying mixed flocks. It hops and flits about while flashing its tail to frighten insects which are then caught in aerial pursuits. It will occasionally take protein corpuscles from Cecropia plants and will occasionally glean insects from tree bark.

The slate-throated whitestart's call note is a sharp "pik" note. The song varies with region, although throughout most of range it is a varied series of whistled notes, some slurred up, some slurred down.

From April to May, pairs nest in a bulky, roofed structure with a side entrance, usually nestled in niche in bank or steep slope. The female lays 3, or sometimes 2,  speckled white eggs.

Gallery

References

Further reading

slate-throated whitestart
Birds of Mexico
Birds of Central America
Birds of the Northern Andes
Birds of the Tepuis
slate-throated whitestart
Taxonomy articles created by Polbot